Chabana (茶花, literally "tea flowers") is a generic term for the arrangement of flowers put together for display at a Japanese tea ceremony, and also for the wide variety of plants conventionally considered as appropriate material for such use, as witnessed by the existence of such encyclopedic publications as the Genshoku Chabana Daijiten [All-color encyclopedia of chabana]. The method of arranging the flowers is according to the nageire, or thrown in, style of flower arranging. In turn, nageire is recognized as a certain stylistic category of Kadō, the Japanese "Way of Flowers". These all developed from ikebana, which had its origin in early Buddhist flower offerings (kuge). Chabana, however, refers specifically to the flower display in the room or space for chadō, and though it fundamentally is a form of ikebana, it comprises a genre unto its own.

History 
The history of chabana follows hand-in-hand with the history of chadō, and within that historical milieu, chabana emerged in tandem with the rise of wabi-cha around the Momoyama period. Sen no Rikyū is considered the most influential person in the development of wabi-cha, and is also credited as the originator of the accompanying nageire mode of flower arrangement, which is characterized by freedom and spontaneity in expressing the natural beauty of the material. Among the statements attributed to him, the first one in the set of seven known as "Rikyū's Seven Precepts" (Rikyū shichisoku) concerns chabana.  It goes, "The flowers [Chabana] should be such as they are in the moor." In the history of ikebana, the nageire style was added to the more stylized rikka arrangement around the end of the 1600s, as influenced by chabana. This new style had fewer rules and appealed to those who were searching for a more simple and natural look. Early tea masters used the nageire style until it further divided into the seika, pure  chabana, tea flower, styles. The chabana style, with no formal written rules, became the standard style of arrangement for chanoyu.

Usage
The chabana is among the main focuses of attention for the guests at a tea gathering, being displayed in the tokonoma or other such area set aside for displaying the key thematic elements for the gathering. The main thematic element would be the kakemono, usually a hanging scroll featuring a Zen phrase or similar words written in brush and ink. Usually, the chabana will share the tokonoma space with the kakemono, but depending on the circumstances the kakemono might be up in the tokonoma when the guests first enter the room, and the chabana displayed later, at the main portion of the gathering following the intermission when the guests go out once. In either case, when the guests enter/reenter the room, they first take note of the item or items displayed in the tokonoma, which set the tone for the gathering.

Stylistic traits
Chabana comes with minimal rules and appeals to those who prefer a simple, natural look in their creation. The arrangement is a seasonal expression of flowers placed in a simple vase or basket. It is intended to both heighten and deepen the atmosphere of the tea gathering as called for by the occasion. The materials for the vases range from bronze to both glazed and unglazed ceramics as well as bamboo, glass and other materials. An important concept in chadō is the distinction between shin, gyō, sō, which may be rendered as "formal, moderate, relaxed", a distinction which informs every aspect of chadō. If the space where the tea gathering is taking place is a formal venue, such as a large shoin style reception room, then the chabana suitably should be in a formal vase or basket.

When arranging chabana the host first selects the flowers and then an appropriate vase. No props are used as in ikebana and the finished arrangement of flowers should evoke a feeling similar to what one feels in the natural garden setting.

There are flowers which are considered inappropriate for chabana. They are referred to as kinka, literally "forbidden flowers". According to the Genshoku Chadō Daijiten, they are flowers with unpleasant names, unpleasant odors, strong odors, no clear seasonality, and blooms which are long-lasting.

References

External links 

Chadō
Ikebana